Vsevolodas Dobužinskis  (1906–1998) was a Lithuanian painter. He designed the coat of arms of the Lithuanian SSR.

See also
List of Lithuanian painters

References

Universal Lithuanian Encyclopedia

1906 births
1998 deaths
20th-century Lithuanian painters
Soviet painters